EECS may refer to:

 Electrical Engineering and Computer Science
 European Energy Certificate System

See also 
 EEC (disambiguation)